Count Nikolay Mikhailovich Kamensky (27 December 1776 – 4 May 1811) was a Russian general who outlived his father, Field Marshal Mikhail Kamensky, by two years.

Life and career
Nikolay and his elder brother Sergei were educated at a cadet school. In 1787, he was appointed Aide-de-camp to his father. He participated in the Russo-Turkish War of 1787–1792. French count Louis Langeron, who fought on the Russian Army during this conflict, wrote in his memoirs about Kamensky's behavior during the war. According to him, after being upset by a storm that affected his army, Kamensky took all the Tatar prisoners his army had captured and beheaded them. Later, a Jewish person was tied naked to a post and cold water was sprayed on him, leaving him to freeze to death. Kamensky would later have burned down an entire village and left its inhabitants in the snow to die of cold and hunger, then taking all the surviving animals with his army.

Emperor Paul promoted him to Major General in 1799, the year when Kamensky chose to join Suvorov during the Swiss Campaign against Napoleon.

In the Battle of Austerlitz Kamensky, subordinate to Peter Bagration, lost 1,600 men and barely managed to escape alive. He distinguished himself at Eylau, for which he received the Order of Saint George. Thereupon he was sent with 8,000 soldiers to relieve the siege of Danzig but failed in his objective, losing as many as 1,500 men in the process. The following Battle of Heilsberg cost the lives of 1,700 soldiers under his command.

By the time the Finnish War — the most brilliant campaign of his career — broke out in 1808, Kamensky had a reputation for being reckless with his soldiers' lives. However, he was promoted to Full General in 1809 and achieved important successes against the Swedes at Kuortane and Oravais. It was he who came up with a daring plan of the Russian infantry's crossing the frozen Gulf of Bothnia from Finland towards Umeå and Åland, which forced Sweden to cede Finland to Tsar Alexander.

The war in the north over, Kamensky succeeded Bagration in charge of the Danube Army, which operated against the Turks in the Russo-Turkish War (1806–1812). Accompanied by his elder brother, Kamensky stormed Silistra and Pazardzhik but failed to take Shumen and, initially, Rousse. They together defeated a Turkish force of 40,000 at the Battle of Batin on 9 September 1810.

On 26 October 1810, he roundly defeated a 40,000-strong army of Osman Pasha at Vidin. The Russians lost only 1,500 men, compared with losses of 10,000 for their opponents.

On 4 February 1811, Kamensky caught fever and was transported to Odessa for convalescence, leaving Louis Alexandre Andrault de Langeron in command. He died three months later at the age of 34. Kamensky is related to actress Helen Mirren, whose great-great-great-great-grandfather was his father.

References 

Залесский К.А. Наполеоновские войны 1799-1815. Биографический энциклопедический словарь, Москва, 2003.

1776 births
1811 deaths
Counts of the Russian Empire
Russian commanders of the Napoleonic Wars
Imperial Russian Army generals
Russian military personnel of the Finnish War
Recipients of the Order of St. George of the Second Degree
Russian mass murderers